The Men's tandem sprint B at the 2018 Commonwealth Games was part of the cycling programme, taking place on 7 April 2018. This event was for blind and visually impaired cyclists riding with a sighted pilot.

Records
Prior to this competition, the existing world and Games records were as follows:

Schedule
The schedule was as follows:

All times are Australian Eastern Standard Time (UTC+10)

Results

Qualifying
4 riders will be qualified and seeded for the semifinals according to their times in qualification.

Semifinals
Matches are extended to a best-of-three format hereon. Winners proceed to the gold medal final; losers proceed to the bronze medal final.

Finals
The final classification is determined in the medal finals.

References

Men's tandem sprint B
Cycling at the Commonwealth Games – Men's tandem sprint B